The Gardiner Chess Centre was built at the end of 2002 by Graeme & Wendy Gardiner, in bushland at Mudgeeraba on the Gold Coast (Australia), to provide South-East Queensland, and beyond, with a positive chess learning environment for children and enjoyable chess for adults. Graeme is a former president of the Australian Chess Federation and was also the Development Officer of the nearby Somerset College for many years. Wendy worked at the University of Queensland - initially in department of parasitology and then in tropical health.

During operation
The Gardiner Chess Centre was one of a new breed of Modern Chess Centres. It contained coaching areas, a chess book and equipment shop, a cafe, internet facilities, a library, a spacious tournament hall equipped with monitors and technology for broadcasting live games online. The centre also contained an office from which a large chess in schools program was run.  Assisted by guest coaches like Grand Master Ian Rogers, it gathered a highly positive reputation in the international chess community, and is widely considered as a benchmark in chess centre design.

Sale and Closure
The Gardiner Chess centre has now been sold. Gardiner Chess continues to operate, however, with tournaments being hosted by venues such as Emmanuel College, Gold Coast.

See also

External links
http://www.gardinerchess.com.au/
http://www.caq.org.au/

Chess in Australia
Chess places
Sport on the Gold Coast, Queensland
Educational institutions established in 2002
Event venues established in 2002
2002 establishments in Australia